Tuscarora Lake also called Erieville Reservoir is a lake located by Erieville, New York. The lake was created in 1850 as a feeder for the Erie Canal and is still used as a feeder for the canal. Tuscarora Lake is the highest reservoir in New York State. The lake is stocked with fish each year with funds that are provided by donations and proceeds from the ice-fishing derby. Fish species that are present in the lake include pumpkinseed sunfish, walleye, and largemouth bass.

References

Lakes of New York (state)
Lakes of Madison County, New York